Yippy was a metasearch engine that grouped searched results into clusters. It was originally developed and released by Vivísimo in 2004 under the name Clusty, before Vivisimo was later acquired by IBM and Yippy was sold in 2010 to a company now called Yippy, Inc. At the time, the website received 100,000 unique visitors a month.

, Yippy's main page states their searches are powered by IBM Watson, asserting it is "the right search" (italics theirs)  that "delivers fair search results based on balanced algorithms."

In 2019, Yippy, Inc. CEO Rich Granville presented the search engine as free of censorship of conservative views and called the company an "intelligence enterprise" with high-level White House connections.

As of 2021, the website redirects to DuckDuckGo.

History

Clusty was developed by Vivísimo in Pittsburgh, Pennsylvania. Vivísimo was a company built on Web search technology developed by Carnegie Mellon University researchers, much like Lycos was a decade earlier. Clusty added new features and a new interface to the previous Vivisimo clustering web metasearch. Different tabs also offer metasearches for news, jobs (in partnership with Indeed.com), U.S. government info and blogs. Customized tabs allow users to select sources for their own metasearch to create personalized tabs.

Yippy Inc., formerly Cinnabar Ventures Inc., acquired Clusty for $5.55 million in May 2010. The acquisition included the  license for the Velocity software, which was bought by IBM in 2012 and renamed IBM Watson Explorer.

In 2012, Yippy received "Welcome to the Cloud" as a registered trademark with the USPTO.

Yippy acquired MuseGlobal 6,500 pre-built Smart Connectors fully documented Source Factory that monitors, maintains and updates the Muse Smart Connectors on a 24/7 basis and guarantees high sustainable and scalable use.

Yippy received "Welcome to your Data" as a registered trademark with the USPTO.

In 2016, Yippy released its Yippy Search Appliance (YSA) as a Google Search Appliance (GSA) replacement to  market after Google announced it was sunsetting the GSA and capitalize on the $500M revenue from the GSA.

In 2019, Yippy Inc. CEO Rich Granville organized in Atlanta a "Digital Soldiers Conference", with the aim of preparing "patriotic social media warriors" for a coming "digital civil war" against "censorship and suppression". The event featured several prominent Donald Trump supporters, including Michael Flynn and George Papadopoulos. At the time, Granville also used many QAnon references on Twitter.

In late April 2021, Yippy's site started redirecting to DuckDuckGo. As of August 2021, the Georgia Secretary of State website shows Yippy, Inc's corporate status as "Revoked".

See also 
 Data clustering
 Metasearch engine
 Vivísimo

References

External links 
Yippy search engine

Internet properties established in 2004
Defunct internet search engines
Metasearch engines